Juvenile Offender (lit. "Crime Boys") is a 2012 South Korean film about a teenage criminal who reunites with his mother, who gave him up at birth.

It won the Special Jury Prize at the 25th Tokyo International Film Festival, and Best Actor for Seo Young-Joo. It was also awarded the Lino Brocka Grand Prize and Best Actor at the 14th Cinemanila International Film Festival as well as Best Children's Feature Film at the 2013 Asia Pacific Screen Awards.

The film was selected as the South Korean entry for the Best Foreign Language Film at the 86th Academy Awards,  but it was not nominated.

Plot
Jang Ji-Goo is a 16-year-old juvenile offender under probation who lives with his only known relative - his grandfather who is sick in bed all the time with severe diabetic complications. To Ji-Goo, home is only a place that stinks with sickness and school, a place to hang out. His only interest in life is his sweet new girlfriend, Kim Sae-Rom. One day, he gets caught after committing burglary with the neighborhood big boys. And without a parent to plead for him, the judge sentences Ji-Goo to the juvenile reformatory while others get lighter penalties.

Eleven months later, Ji-Goo is informed that his grandfather has died. After the funeral, his teacher tracks down Ji-Goo's mom, who he thought was dead but in fact had run away from home after giving birth to him at age 17. Ji-Goo is simply shocked to realize that he has a mother. But after he gets discharged from the juvenile reformatory, he and his young mother try to make up for their time lost. Ji-Goo starts off living together with his mother with high expectations, but he soon realizes that his mother is much too young just like himself and he comes to understand why she had to leave him right after giving birth. But when Ji-Goo falls into a similar situation with his girlfriend, his mother, who he thought would understand is appalled at the news which creates a conflict between the two.

Cast
Lee Jung-Hyun as Hyo-Seung 
Seo Young-Joo - Jang Ji-Goo
Jun Ye-Jin as Kim Sae-Rom
Kang Rae-yeon as Ji-Young
Jung Suk-Yong as Kim Sun-Saeng
Choi Won-Tae as Jae-Bum
Kang Hyuk-Il as Ok-Hyun
Seo Young-Hwa as Judge
Jun Young-Woon as Jang Ji-Goo's grandfather 
Kim Kyung-Ryong as Ok-Hyun's father  
Lee Yoon-Sang as Kim Sae-Rom's father

Release
The film was selected in 'Contemporary World Cinema' at 2012 Toronto International Film Festival held in September 2012.

Awards and nominations

See also
 List of submissions to the 86th Academy Awards for Best Foreign Language Film
 List of South Korean submissions for the Academy Award for Best Foreign Language Film

References

External links
  
 
 
 

2012 films
South Korean drama films
Teenage pregnancy in film
2010s South Korean films